A CO-oximeter is a device that measures the oxygen carrying state of hemoglobin in a blood specimen, including oxygen-carrying hemoglobin (O2Hb), non-oxygen-carrying but normal hemoglobin (HHb) (formerly, but incorrectly, referred to as 'reduced' hemoglobin), as well as the dyshemoglobins such as carboxyhemoglobin (COHb) and methemoglobin (MetHb). The use of 'CO' rather than 'Co' or 'co' is more appropriate since this designation represents a device that measures carbon monoxide (CO) bound to hemoglobin, as distinguished from simple oximetry which measures hemoglobin bound to molecular oxygen—O2Hb—or hemoglobin capable of binding to molecular oxygen—HHb. Simpler oximeters may report oxygen saturation alone, i.e. the ratio of oxyhemoglobin to total 'bindable' hemoglobin (i.e. oxyhemoglobin + deoxyhemoglobin-HHb). CO-oximetry is useful in defining the causes for hypoxemia, or hypoxia, (oxygen deficiency at the tissue level).

Mechanism
A CO-oximeter measures the absorption of light passing through blood from few as two or three wavelengths of light to several dozens of wavelengths, in order to distinguish oxyhemoglobin, and deoxyhemoglobin (formerly called 'reduced' hemoglobin), and thus determine the oxyhemoglobin saturation (the percentage of oxygenated hemoglobin compared to the total amount of available hemoglobin (Hb)). Measurement of greater numbers of wavelengths enables the instrument to distinguish between these and carboxyhemoglobin,-COHb,  methemoglobin -metHb, other hemoglobin moieties and 'background' light-absorbing species. Traditionally, measurement is made from arterial blood processed in a specific device designed to be able to measure proportions of multiple components of several hemoglobin moieties using multi-wavelength spectrophotometry and complex, but straightforward internal computations. While these units still are in wide use, blood gas analyzers with integral CO-oximetry modules have also been developed and successfully marketed by several manufacturers. More recently, some 'pulse' or more precisely 'peripheral'  oximeters have made it possible to estimate carboxyhemoglobin with non-invasive technology similar to a simple (peripheral) pulse oximeter. In contrast, the use of a standard or simple pulse oximeter is not effective in the diagnosis of CO poisoning as patients who have carbon monoxide poisoning may have a normal oxygen saturation reading on a pulse oximeter.

Usage
When a patient presents with carbon monoxide poisoning (CO) or other non-respiratory hypoxic symptoms, most current CO-oximeters will detect the relative levels of each hemoglobin fraction (oxyhemoglobin and dyshemoglobins) and likely  the oxyhemoglobin saturation. For any system making these measurements it is critical that the device clearly distinguish between Oxygen Saturation' and Fractional Oxyhemoglobin" . The issue here is the careless use of saturation vs. fractional oxyhemoglobin, which both measure the same entity -oxyhemoglobin- but the oxygen saturation uses as its base only the hemoglobin available for binding, while the fractional oxyhemoglobin uses the total hemoglobin in the  sample as its base. In normal subjects the values are nearly identical-thus leading to terminologic and possibly clinical confusion. A simple oximeter measuring only oxygen derivatives, may report a normal saturation or even a hyperoxic state if oxygen gas has been administered when in fact there is serious compromise of oxygen carrying ability of the hemoglobin present.

See also
Breath carbon monoxide

References

CLSI, C46-A2- Blood Gas and pH Analysis and Related Measurements; Approved Guideline—Second Edition, Wayne, PA, 2010
Zijlstra WJ, Maas AHJ, Moran RF. Definition, significance and measurement of quantities pertaining to the oxygen carrying properties of human blood.. Scand J Clin Lab Invest , 56(Suppl), 224, 27–45, 1996
Brunelle JA, Degtiarov AM, Moran RF, Race LA, Simultaneous measurement of total hemoglobin and its derivatives in blood using CO-oximeters: Analytical principles;  Their application in selecting analytical wavelengths and reference methods; A  comparison of the results of the choices made. Scand J Clin Lab Invest, 56: (Suppl) 224, 47–69, 1996.
Brunelle JA, Moran RF, Data processing in CO-oximeters that Use overdetermined systems (Reply).  Clin Chem, 43:1, 189–191, 1997
Degen BR, Moran RF, Comparison and assessment of blood gas related quantities including base excess, the gas exchange indices and temperature corrected pH/ PO2/PCO2 ,  as defined in approved NCCLS standard C12-A, using a computer simulation of input variables., Scand J Clin Lab Invest ,  56:(Suppl) 224, 89-106 1996.
Moran R,  Hemoglobin F and measurement of oxygen saturation and fractional oxyhemoglobin. Clin Lab Sci,  7:3, 162–164, 1994.
Brunnelle JA, Degtiarov AM, Moran RF, Race LA, CO-oximetric measurement of oxyhemoglobin, deoxyhemoglobin, and dyshemoglobins in blood: Effects of analytical wavelength and reference method  selection.  Lab Hematol. 1:2, 161 - 164, 1995.
Moran RF,   Implications of Fetal Hemoglobin : Measurement of oxygen saturation, fractional oxyhemoglobin, carboxyhemoglobin and methemoglobin. Crit Care International,  April–May, 8–9,  1995.
Moran RF, The case for standardized terminology: Oxygen "saturation" values can trick the unwary and lead to clinical misjudgement., Crit Care Med, 21:5, 805–807, 1993.
Moran RF, Lab Consultant: [High Percentage of zero carboxyhemoglobins due to correction algorithm for small, "impossible", values.] Clin Chem News, 18:12, 18–19, 1992.
CLSI document C25A, can provide in-depth information and references.

Medical testing equipment
Oxygen

de:Pulsoxymetrie#CO-Oxymeter